The Balçova Gondola is a two-station aerial lift line of gondola type in İzmir, Turkey. Situated in the district of Balçova, it operates between Yeşiloğlu Hill and the summit of Dede Mountain. It is the second oldest aerial lift in the country, after the Bursa Uludağ Aerial Tramway.

Balçova Gondola was first constructed between 1972-1973 by a Germany-based company and began operating on 24 March 1974. The construction cost was 695,000 mark. In 2008, following a report by the İzmir Branch of Chamber of Mechanical Engineers, the line was closed down due to security reasons. The gondola line is owned by the İzmir Metropolitan Municipality.

Features
 Length: 
 Height difference: 
 Speed: max. 5 m/s
 Ridership: 1,200 hourly
 Number of cabins: 20
 Cabin capacity: 8
 Cable diameter: 45 mm

See also
 List of gondola lifts in Turkey

References

Gondola lifts in Turkey
1974 establishments in Turkey
Transport infrastructure completed in 1974
Tourist attractions in İzmir
Buildings and structures in İzmir
Balçova